Traveller Record Sheets is a 1980 role-playing game supplement for Traveller published by Paranoia Press. Traveller Record Sheets consisted of several pads of approved Traveller record sheets, including Personal Data Sheets, Starship Logs, Ship's Papers/Ship's Design Worksheets, and System Data Sheets.

Reception
William A. Barton reviewed Traveller Record Sheets in The Space Gamer No. 36. Barton commented that "All of these record sheets are well-conceived and quite impressive in appearance and content. They should provide an excellent aid for both Traveller players and referees - especially the Personal Data Sheet."

References

Character sheets
Role-playing game supplements introduced in 1980
Traveller (role-playing game) supplements